Panyu District Public Transport is a local bus operator in the Panyu District of Guangdong province in China.

Routes

There are 22 bus routes service nearby factories and residential complexes.

Popular routes include:

 Route 11
 Route 12
 Route 13

Routes will likely make connections with the Panyu station of the Guangzhou Metro Line 3.

Fleet

The operator uses aqua coloured Chinese built buses on the routes within Panyu.

Panyu Public Transport operates a fleet of 180 buses. The buses consist of hard stainless steel seats with no air-conditioning or heating.

Fares

Buses accepts cash (RMB) ranging from 1.5 to 3 yuan and a smart card system (2-3 yuan) similar to the Octopus Card used in Hong Kong.

References
 More public buses for Panyu, Huadu

Transport in Guangdong
Panyu District
Bus transport in China
Transport companies of China